Amboyna diapella is a species of moth of the family Tortricidae. It is found in Australia, where it has been recorded from Queensland.

The wingspan is about 11.5 mm.

References

Moths described in 1965
Tortricini
Moths of Australia